Hegh is a Norwegian surname. Notable people with the surname include:

Anita Hegh (born 1972), Australian actress
Emilie Hegh Arntzen, Norwegian handball player
Gustav Adolf Hegh (1927–2010), Norwegian actor
Hanne Hegh (born 1960), Norwegian handball player

Norwegian-language surnames